Springfield is a town in Penobscot County, Maine, United States. The population was 293 at the 2020 census.

Geography

Climate
This climatic region is typified by large seasonal temperature differences, with warm to hot (and often humid) summers and cold (sometimes severely cold) winters.  According to the Köppen Climate Classification system, Springfield has a humid continental climate, abbreviated "Dfb" on climate maps.

Historic building

The Gothic Revival-style Springfield Congregational Church (1852) is listed on the National Register of Historic Places.

Demographics

2010 census
As of the census of 2010, there were 409 people, 171 households, and 109 families living in the town. The racial makeup of the town was 96.6% White, 0.7% Native American, and 2.7% from two or more races. Hispanic or Latino of any race were 1.0% of the population.

There were 171 households, of which 24.6% had children under the age of 18 living with them, 53.2% were married couples living together, 6.4% had a female householder with no husband present, 4.1% had a male householder with no wife present, and 36.3% were non-families. 29.2% of all households were made up of individuals, and 12.9% had someone living alone who was 65 years of age or older. The average household size was 2.39 and the average family size was 2.91.

The median age in the town was 47.7 years. 20.3% of residents were under the age of 18; 6.8% were between the ages of 18 and 24; 18.3% were from 25 to 44; 32.5% were from 45 to 64; and 22% were 65 years of age or older. The gender makeup of the town was 53.1% male and 46.9% female.

2000 census
As of the census of 2000, there were 379 people, 150 households, and 109 families living in the town.  The population density was 9.9 people per square mile (3.8/km).  There were 196 housing units at an average density of 5.1 per square mile (2.0/km).  The racial makeup of the town was 96.57% White, 0.79% African American, 0.26% Asian, 1.06% from other races, and 1.32% from two or more races.

There were 150 households, out of which 30.7% had children under the age of 18 living with them, 58.0% were married couples living together, 8.0% had a female householder with no husband present, and 27.3% were non-families. 23.3% of all households were made up of individuals, and 12.0% had someone living alone who was 65 years of age or older.  The average household size was 2.53 and the average family size was 2.93.

In the town, the population was spread out, with 24.5% under the age of 18, 5.5% from 18 to 24, 27.7% from 25 to 44, 26.6% from 45 to 64, and 15.6% who were 65 years of age or older.  The median age was 40 years. For every 100 females, there were 115.3 males.  For every 100 females age 18 and over, there were 113.4 males.

The median income for a household in the town was $26,875, and the median income for a family was $28,125. Males had a median income of $29,063 versus $27,500 for females. The per capita income for the town was $12,082.  About 14.3% of families and 16.9% of the population were below the poverty line, including 13.8% of those under age 18 and 6.9% of those age 65 or over.

References

External links
 Springfield Fair

Towns in Penobscot County, Maine
Towns in Maine